Bastian Roscheck (born 24 February 1991) is a German handball player for SC DHfK Leipzig and the German national team.

He participated at the 2018 European Men's Handball Championship.

References

1991 births
Living people
Sportspeople from Krefeld
German male handball players